South Street Area Historic District is a national historic district located in Auburn.  The district contains 164 contributing resources and includes structures dating from 1800 to the 1940s. It is linear in orientation and about a mile in length along South Street from Metcalf Drive to Lincoln Street. Located within the district is the separately listed William H. Seward House.

The historic district was listed on the National Register of Historic Places in 1991.

See also
National Register of Historic Places listings in Cayuga County, New York

References
Notes

Historic districts on the National Register of Historic Places in New York (state)
Historic districts in Cayuga County, New York
National Register of Historic Places in Cayuga County, New York
Buildings and structures in Auburn, New York